The Sun Odyssey 39 DS (Deck Salon) is a French sailboat that was designed by Marc Lombard and Vittorio Garroni as a cruiser and first built in 2008.

Production
The design was built by Jeanneau in France, starting in 2008, but it is now out of production.

Design
The Sun Odyssey 39 DS is a recreational keelboat, built predominantly of resin-injected polyester fiberglass, with a core of end-grain balsa. It has a 9/10 fractional sloop rig, with a deck-stepped mast, two sets of swept spreaders and aluminum spars with continuous stainless steel 1X19 wire rigging. An in-mast furling mainsail was a factory option. The hull has a raked stem, a reverse transom with a swimming platform, an internally mounted spade-type rudder controlled by dual wheels and a fixed fin keel, deep draft fin keel or optional shoal-draft keel.

A "performance" version has a mast that is about  taller and a sail area that is 17% larger. 

The fin keel model displaces  and carries  of cast iron ballast, the deep draft version carries  of ballast, while the shoal draft version displaces  and carries  of ballast.

The design has sleeping accommodation for four people, with a double "V"-berth in the bow cabin, a "U"-shaped settee and a straight settee in the main cabin and an aft cabin with a transversal double berth on the starboard side. The galley is located on the starboard, side just forward of the companionway ladder. The galley is "L"-shaped and is equipped with a two-burner stove, an ice box and a double sink. A navigation station is opposite the galley, on the port side. The head is located just aft of the companionway on the port side and includes a shower.

Operational history
A Cruising World review in January 2007 by Andrew Burton stated, "the twin wheels allow the helmsman to get well outboard with a good view of the sails, and the primary winches are immediately forward of the wheels so the driver can trim the jib. The helm had a nice, tight feel, and I found the boat a pleasure to steer. Even with in-mast furling, the SO 39 DS performed well in my light-air test sail."

In a second Andrew Burton Cruising World review in February 2007, he wrote, "The DS in the Jeanneau Sun Odyssey 39 DS stands for deck saloon. In this case that’s a bit of a stretch; the house is higher than on the boat’s racier sister, the 39i, but seating isn't at deck level. Semantic nitpicking aside, this is a good entry onto the cruising-boat scene ... Two couples will be happy cruising on the Sun Odyssey 39 DS. The boat's performance will please racers, while the amenities throughout will ensure everyone aboard understands that they’re cruising.

In a 2017 Sail Magazine review reported, "the most recent deck-saloon launch, the 39 DS, is probably about the minimum length for this popular layout and is designed to provide, in a smaller package, the features its bigger sisterships provide. The freeboard is necessarily high, but the curvy line of the deck saloon makes the boat attractive."

See also
List of sailing boat types

References

External links

Keelboats
2000s sailboat type designs
Sailing yachts
Sailboat type designs by Vittorio Garroni
Sailboat type designs by Marc Lombard Design
Sailboat types built by Jeanneau